Kushimoto is a town at Wakayama Prefecture in Japan, and it may refer to:

Places
 Kushimoto, Wakayama, a coastal town located in Higashimuro District, Wakayama Prefecture in western Japan
 Kushimoto Station, a railway station in Kushimoto, Higashimuro District, Wakayama Prefecture, Japan
 Kushimoto Street, a business street in Mersin, Turkey, a  twin city of Kushimoto
 Kushimoto Turkish Memorial and Museum, a monument and a museum to commemorate the sailors of the  Ottoman frigate Ertuğrul, which sunk in 1890 off Kushimoto, Wakayama in Japan